Mater si, magistra no (literally "Mother yes, teacher no") is a macaronic phrase that means Catholics need not follow all the teachings of the Catholic Church, particularly in regard to economic justice or the rights of workers.  It was originally in direct response to the papal encyclical Mater et Magistra of 1961, as a reference to the then-current anti-Castro slogan, "Cuba sí, Castro no."

History
The original use was focused on the Church's 1960s teachings on social policy but Roman Catholic publications such as the New Oxford Review and the National Catholic Reporter have described it as a slogan for "'pick-and-choose Catholicism" or for those who have a "deep love for the faith and tradition, coupled with skepticism about ecclesiastical authority and its claims to special wisdom."

The phrase is often attributed to William F. Buckley, Jr; although it was first published in Buckley's National Review, the phrase was actually coined by Garry Wills during a telephone conversation with Buckley.

Russell Shaw says the phrase "helped set the stage for the self-righteous dismissals that greeted the 1968 publication of Pope Paul VI's encyclical Humanae Vitae", and later Pope Francis's Laudato si' on the environment. It became the expression of a knee-jerk antipathy to church teaching [which] spread to other areas where dissenters happened not to like what was taught.

Cultural impact
 When Commonweal published Eamon Duffy's negative review of Wills's 2000 book Papal Sin, the caption on the front cover read "Mater Si, Wills No".
National Review editor Priscilla Buckley subsequently regretted having published the phrase, stating in 2005 that it had "got (National Review) into lots and lots of trouble ... over lots and lots of years".

References

External links
John XXIII: Mater et Magistra (Critical Comments Selected by Gerald Darring) from the Theology Library of Spring Hill College

Latin religious words and phrases
Catholic Church in the United States
Criticism of the Catholic Church
1961 neologisms